Saint-Didier-au-Mont-d'Or is a commune in the Metropolis of Lyon in Auvergne-Rhône-Alpes region in eastern France.

The residents of the city are called Désidériens.

It is one of the richest communes in the urban area of Lyon. It is also the second highest French commune per capita income.

Population

See also
Communes of the Metropolis of Lyon

References

External links

  Mairie de Saint-Didier-au-Mont-d'Or

Communes of Lyon Metropolis
Lyonnais